Kaylee Kimber (born 13 September 2003) is an Australian rules footballer playing for the Gold Coast Suns in the AFL Women's (AFLW).

Early life
Kimber grew up in Moranbah, Queensland, located 200km south-west of Mackay. A netballer in her younger years, she switched to Australian rules football for the first time at 16 years of age with the Moranbah Bulldogs in the local AFL Mackay competition before relocating to the Gold Coast in early 2022 to play for the Southport Sharks in the top state level QAFLW competition. Kimber was added to the Gold Coast Suns list in August 2022 as an injury replacement for fellow Mackay-Isaac region product Alana Gee.

AFL Women's career
Kimber made her AFLW debut for the Gold Coast Suns at 18 years of age in round 8 of season seven. She kicked her first goal in the AFLW in the following round.

References

External links
 

2003 births
Living people
Sportswomen from Queensland
Australian rules footballers from Queensland
Gold Coast Football Club (AFLW) players